James Joseph Valek (January 25, 1928 – September 4, 2005) was an American football player, coach, and executive.  He served as the head football coach at the University of Illinois at Urbana–Champaign from 1967 to 1970, compiling a record of 8–32. Valek also coached the New York Knights, of the Arena Football League, to a 2–10 record in 1988.

Head coaching record

College

References

1928 births
2005 deaths
American football ends
Arena Football League coaches
Army Black Knights football coaches
Dallas Cowboys scouts
Illinois Fighting Illini football coaches
Illinois Fighting Illini football players
New England Patriots coaches
New England Patriots executives
South Carolina Gamecocks football coaches
Wichita State Shockers football coaches
High school football coaches in Illinois
Sportspeople from Joliet, Illinois
Players of American football from Illinois